Madelyn van der Hoogt (b. 1941) is an American weaver, teacher and writer who formerly edited Prairie Wool Companion, Weaver's, and Handwoven magazine.

Early life and education 
Born in 1941, Madelyn Joy Sanborn lived in Los Angeles, where she attended Overland Avenue Elementary School, Palms Junior High, and Alexander Hamilton High School. She earned a B.A. in English and a teaching certificate in 1963 at the University of California, Berkeley. She married Gerrit van der Hoogt in 1966.

Career 
Van der Hoogt taught English at Claremont Junior High and Oakland Tech in Oakland, California. The van der Hoogts moved in 1974 to Fayette, Missouri, where she taught English at Fayette High School.

In the 1970's, van der Hoogt learned to weave in Guatemala. With an interest in textiles, weaving, and looms, she edited Weaver's magazine (1986–1999) and Handwoven (1999–2012). In 1984 she established The Weavers' School in Fayette, Missouri. In 1993, van der Hoogt moved to Whidbey Island in Puget Sound with her looms and the school. Suzie Liles, of the Eugene Textile Center, became her Studio Director.

She has lectured and taught workshops for more than thirty-five years, in the United States, Canada, and Australia. In 2012, she retired from editing Handwoven magazine, to teach, weave, and write.

In naming van der Hoogt to "The Weaving Hall of Fame", Sherrie Amada Miller wrote,"She is the world's Weaving Wizard. As former editor of Prairie Wool Companion, Weaver's, and Handwoven, she has long been a star in our weaving universe."

She teaches weaving at the Weavers' School in Coupeville, Washington.

Selected publications

Books 
Van der Hoogt edited the Best of Weaver's Series.

DVDs

References 

1941 births
20th-century American women artists
20th-century women textile artists
20th-century textile artists
21st-century American women artists
21st-century women textile artists
21st-century textile artists
American textile artists
Living people